Buono is an Italian surname. Notable people with the surname include:

Angelo Buono Jr. (1934–2002), American serial killer
Barbara Buono (born 1953), American Democratic Party politician
Cara Buono (born 1971), American actress
Cosmo Buono,  American pianist
John L. Buono (born 1943),  American Republican Party politician
Victor Buono (1938–1982), American actor and comic
Wally Buono (born 1950), Canadian head coach, general manager and alternate governor

Italian-language surnames